Le Lys (The Lily), also known as Liliya, is a ballet in 3 acts/4 scenes, with choreography by Arthur Saint-Léon and music by Ludwig Minkus.

Principal dancers at the première included Adèle Grantzow.

Notes
 For this ballet Minkus reused and adapted much of the music he had composed for Saint-Léon's 1866 La Source.

Ballet
Ballets by Ludwig Minkus
Ballets by Arthur Saint-Léon
1869 ballet premieres